Harold A. Katz (November 2, 1921 – December 6, 2012) was an American lawyer and politician.

Early life and career
Katz was born in Shelbyville, Tennessee. He received his bachelor's degree in economics in 1943 from Vanderbilt University. Katz worked for the National War Labor Board in Chicago, Illinois during World War II. Katz received his J.D. degree in 1948 from the University of Chicago Law School and his master's degree in economics in 1958 from the University of Chicago. He was a law partner in Katz and Friedman. He served for a time as the Master in Chancery for the Circuit Court of Cook County. Katz served as a special legal advisor to the Illinois Department of Labor and special legal assistant to Governor Otto Kerner Jr. during the 72nd and 73rd sessions of the General Assembly. During his time as a special legal assistant to the Governor, Katz served as a member of the Governor's Advisory Board on Unemployment Compensation. He served as the U.S. Chairman for the International Society for Labor Law and Social Legislation. He was married Ethel Mae Lewison and had four children. Katz was a resident of Glencoe, Illinois.

Political career
Katz served in the Illinois House of Representatives from 1965 to 1982 and was a Democrat. Katz chose to retire rather than run for reelection in the 1982 general election.

Notes

1921 births
2012 deaths
People from Shelbyville, Tennessee
Lawyers from Chicago
Politicians from Chicago
Vanderbilt University alumni
University of Illinois alumni
Democratic Party members of the Illinois House of Representatives
20th-century American lawyers